

Lady of Joinville

?House of Joinville, 1020–1417

House of Vaudémont, 1417–1551

Princess of Joinville

House of Guise, 1551/2–1641

House of Joyeuse, 1641–1654
None

House of Guise, 1654–1688

House of Bourbon, 1654–1693
None

House of Orléans, since 1693
Bolded name are Princess who actually used the title above any other of their titles.

See also
Duchess of Aumale
Duchess of Mayenne
Duchess of Lorraine
Duchess of Guise
Duchess of Orléans

Notes

Sources
CHAMPAGNE NOBILITY

 
French princesses
Joinville